Ataseven is a Turkish surname. Notable people with the surname include:

 Asaf Ataseven (1932–2003), Turkish physician
 Eray Ataseven (born 1993), Turkish footballer
 Metin Ataseven (born 1972), Swedish politician

Turkish-language surnames